German Corners is an unincorporated community located in the town of Greenbush, Sheboygan County, Wisconsin, United States.

Notes

German-American culture in Wisconsin
Unincorporated communities in Sheboygan County, Wisconsin
Unincorporated communities in Wisconsin